Magia is the 9th single of Japanese girl group Kalafina. The title track is the ending theme to the anime series Puella Magi Madoka Magica. As of 2011, Magia is the best-selling single of Kalafina. A second iteration, "Magia (Quattro)", was used as the ending theme for the film adaptation, Puella Magi Madoka Magica Part 1: Beginnings, and was included on the single release of "Hikari Furu" on October 26, 2012. Mary's Blood recorded a heavy metal cover of the song for their 2020 cover album Re>Animator.

Track list

Regular edition

Limited edition

Anime edition

Notes:
 The anime edition came without a DVD (only CD; the DVD is for the limited edition).
 The anime edition was also limited and were available until the end of March, 2011.

Charts

References

External links
 Kalafina's Official Site

2011 singles
Songs written by Yuki Kajiura
Kalafina songs
Puella Magi Madoka Magica songs